The Quick and the Dead is a collection of stories by author Vincent Starrett. It was released in 1965 and was the author's only collection of stories published by Arkham House.  It was released in an edition of 2,047 copies.  The stories were originally published between 1920 and 1932 in various pulp magazines.

Contents

The Quick and the Dead contains the following tales:

 "The Fugitive"
 "The Man in the Cask"
 "The Quick and the Dead"
 "The Sinless Village"
 "The Head of Cromwell"
 "Penelope"
 "The Elixir of Death"
 "Coffins for Two"
 "The Tattooed Man"
 "Footsteps of Fear"

References

1965 short story collections
Fantasy short story collections
Horror short story collections